Third-seeded Doris Hart defeated Patricia Todd 6–4, 4–6, 6–2 in the final to win the women's singles tennis title at the 1950 French Championships.

Seeds
The seeded players are listed below. Doris Hart is the champion; others show the round in which they were eliminated.

 Margaret duPont (quarterfinals)
 Louise Brough (semifinals)
 Doris Hart (champion)
 Patricia Todd (finalist)
 Shirley Fry (quarterfinals)
 Annalisa Bossi (quarterfinals)
 Rita Anderson (third round)
 Joan P. Curry (third round)

Draw

Key
 Q = Qualifier
 WC = Wild card
 LL = Lucky loser
 r = Retired

Finals

Earlier rounds

Section 1

Section 2

Section 3

Section 4

References

External links
   on the French Open website

1950 in women's tennis
1950
1950 in French women's sport
1950 in French tennis